Swelling Melodies is a 1955 East German musical film directed by E.W. Fiedler and starring Erich Arnold, Jarmila Ksírová and Sonja Schöner. It is an adaptation of the operetta Die Fledermaus by Johann Strauss II and Richard Genée and was part of a tradition of operetta films in German cinema.. It was released in 1955, and sold 4,968,582 tickets.

It was made by the state-backed DEFA studios. The film's sets were designed by Artur Günther.

Cast
 Erich Arnold as Gabriel von Eisenstein
 Jarmila Ksírová as Rosalinde von Eisenstein
 Sonja Schöner as Adele
 Herbert Kiper as Dr. Falke
 Gerd Frickhöffer as Prinz Orlofsky
 Rolf Weih as Alfred
 Hans Wocke as Gefängnisdirektor Frank
 Joseph Egger as Gefängniswärter Frosch
 Elvira Sternbeck as Ida
 Hans Klering as Dr. Blind
 Hans Alexander as Gefangener
 Günter Beurenmeister as Verehrer
 Kurt Bobeth-Bolander as Bersitz
 Ursula Dücker as Dame
 Christine Fischer as Dame
 Walter Grimm as Herr
 Ernst Paul Hempel as Briefträger
 Hella Jansen as Dame
 Günter Klostermann as Offizier
 Gerhard Lau as Diener
 Anna Lindemann as Dame
 Herbert Mewes-Conti as Verehrer
 Walter Salow as Diener
 Nico Turoff as Diener
 Ernst Ullrich as Gefangener
 Inka Unverzagt as Dame
 Teddy Wulff as Verehrer

References

Bibliography 
 Liehm, Mira & Liehm, Antonín J. The Most Important Art: Eastern European Film After 1945. University of California Press, 1977.

External links
 

1955 films
1950s German-language films
German historical musical films
1950s historical musical films
East German films
Operetta films
Films based on operettas
Films set in the 1870s
Films set in Vienna
1950s German films